The Royal Society for the Protection of Birds (RSPB) is a charitable organisation registered in England and Wales and in Scotland. It was founded in 1889. It works to promote conservation and protection of birds and the wider environment through public awareness campaigns, petitions and through the operation of nature reserves throughout the United Kingdom.

In 2021/22 the RSPB had revenue of £157 million, 2,200 employees, 10,500 volunteers and 1.1 million members (including 195,000 youth members), making it one of the world's largest wildlife conservation organisations. The RSPB has many local groups and maintains 222 nature reserves. As founders, chief officers and presidents, women have been at the helm of the RSPB for over 85 years.

History

The origins of the RSPB lie with two groups of women, both formed in 1889:
 The Plumage League was founded by Emily Williamson at her house in Didsbury, Manchester, as a protest group campaigning against the use of great crested grebe and kittiwake skins and feathers in fur clothing. The house is now in Fletcher Moss Botanical Garden.
 The Fin, Fur and Feather Folk was founded in Croydon by Eliza Phillips, Etta Lemon, Catherine Hall, Hannah Poland and others.

The groups gained in popularity and amalgamated in 1891 to form the Society for the Protection of Birds in London. The Society gained its Royal Charter in 1904.

The original members of the SPB were all women who campaigned against the fashion of the time for women to wear exotic feathers in hats, and the consequent encouragement of "plume hunting". To this end the Society had two simple rules:

At the time of founding, the trade in plumage for use in hats was very large: in the first quarter of 1884, almost 7,000 bird-of-paradise skins were being imported to Britain, along with 400,000 birds from West India and Brazil, and 360,000 birds from East India.

In 1890, the society published its first leaflet, entitled Destruction of Ornamental-Plumaged Birds, aimed at saving the egret population by informing wealthy women of the environmental damage wrought by the use of feathers in fashion. A later 1897 publication, Bird Food in Winter, aimed to address the use of berries as winter decoration and encouraged the use of synthetic berries to preserve the birds food source. In 1897 the SPB distributed over 16,000 letters and 50,000 leaflets and by 1898 had 20,000 members.

The Society attracted support from some women of high social standing who belonged to the social classes that popularised the wearing of feathered hats, including the Duchess of Portland (who became the Society's first President) and the Ranee of Sarawak. As the organisation began to attract the support of many other influential figures, both male and female, such as the ornithologist Professor Alfred Newton, it gained in popularity and attracted many new members. The society received a Royal Charter in 1904 from Edward VII, just 15 years after its founding, and was instrumental in petitioning the Parliament of the United Kingdom to introduce laws banning the use of plumage in clothing.

At the time that the Society was founded in Britain, similar societies were also founded in other European countries. In 1961, the society acquired The Lodge in Sandy, Bedfordshire, as its new headquarters. The RSPB's logo depicts an avocet. The first version was designed by Robert Gillmor.

Activities

Today, the RSPB works with both the civil service and the Government to advise Government policies on conservation and environmentalism. It is one of several organisations that determine the official conservation status list for all birds found in the UK.

The RSPB does not run bird hospitals nor offer animal rescue services.

The RSPB entered into a partnership with UK housebuilder Barratt Developments in 2014.

Reserves

The RSPB maintains over 200 reserves throughout the United Kingdom, covering a wide range of habitats, from estuaries and mudflats to forests and urban habitats. The reserves often have bird hides provided for birdwatchers and many provide visitor centres, which include information about the wildlife that can be seen there.

Awards
The RSPB confers awards, including the President's Award, for volunteers who make a notable contribution to the work of the society.

RSPB Medal

According to the RSPB:

The RSPB Medal is the Society's most prestigious award. It is presented to an individual in recognition of wild bird protection and countryside conservation. It is usually awarded annually to one or occasionally two people.

Magazines
The RSPB has published a members-only magazine for over a century.

Bird Notes

Bird Notes and News was first published in April 1903.

The title changed to Bird Notes in 1947. In the 1950s, there were four copies per year (one for each season, published on the 1st of each third month, March, June, September and December). Each volume covered two years, spread over three calendar years. For example, volume XXV (25), number one was dated Winter 1951, and number eight in the same volume was dated Autumn 1953.

From the mid-1950s, many of the covers were by Charles Tunnicliffe. Two of the originals are on long-term loan to the Tunnicliffe gallery at Oriel Ynys Môn, but in 1995 the RSPB sold 114 at a Sotheby's auction, raising £210,000, the most expensive being a picture of a partridge which sold for £6,440.

From January 1964 (vol. 31, no. 1), publication increased to six per year, (issued in the odd-numbered months, January, March and so on, but dated "January–February", "March–April", etc.). Volumes again covered two years, so vol. 30, covering 1962–63, therefore included nine issues, ending with the "Winter 1963–64" edition instead of eight. The final edition, vol. 31 no. 12, was published in late 1965.

Editors

 Miss M. G. Davies, BA, MBOU (for many years, until vol. 30 no. 9)
 John Clegg (from vol. 31 No. 1 – vol. 31 no. 3)
 Jeremy Boswell (from vol. 31 no. 4 – vol. 31 no. 12)

Birds

Bird Notes''' successor Birds replaced it immediately, with volume 1, number 1 being the January–February 1966 edition. Issues were published quarterly, numbered so that a new volume started every other year.

The Autumn 2013 edition, dated August–October 2013, being vol. 25 no. 7, was the last.

 Nature's Home 

In Winter 2013 Birds was replaced by a new magazine, Nature's Home. The editor was Mark Ward. The magazine had an ABC-certified circulation of 600,885.

 The RSPB Magazine 

With the Summer/Autumn 2022 issue, the magazine has been re-titled.

Junior divisions
The RSPB has two separate groups for children and teenagers: Wildlife Explorers (founded in 1943 as the Junior Bird Recorders' Club; from 1965 to 2000 the Young Ornithologists' Club or YOC) and RSPB Phoenix. Wildlife Explorers is targeted at children aged between 8 and 12, although it also has some younger members, and has two different magazines: Wild Times for 0-7-year-olds, and Wild Explorer for 8-12-year-olds. RSPB Phoenix is aimed at teenagers, and produces Wingbeat magazine, which is primarily written by young people for young people. The RSPB is a member of The National Council for Voluntary Youth Services.

Big Garden Birdwatch
RSPB organises bird record data collection in annual collective birdwatching days in Britain. The RSPB describes this as the "world's biggest wildlife survey" and helps inform conservationists to gain a better knowledge on bird population trends in gardens in Britain. The Big Garden Birdwatch was launched as a children's activity in 1979, but from 2001 it encouraged adults to partake as well. In 2011, over 600,000 people took part, only 37% of whom were RSPB members. This event usually takes place in the last weekend of January. From the start of this annual survey records for house sparrows showed a decline of 60%, while starling populations declined by about 80% from 1979 to 2012.

In 2022, nearly 700,000 people took part in the Big Garden Birdwatch, counting more than 11 billion birds.

 BirdTrack 
BirdTrack is an online citizen science website, operated by the British Trust for Ornithology (BTO) on behalf of a partnership of the BTO, the RSPB, BirdWatch Ireland, the Scottish Ornithologists' Club and the Welsh Ornithological Society.

Finances

The RSPB is funded primarily by its members; in 2006, over 50% of the society's £88 million income came from subscriptions, donations and legacies, worth a total of £53.669 million. As a registered charity, the organisation is entitled to gift aid worth an extra £0.28 on every £1.00 donated by income tax payers. The bulk of the income (£63.757 million in 2006) is spent on conservation projects, maintenance of the reserves and on education projects, with the rest going on fundraising efforts and reducing the pension deficit, worth £19.8 million in 2006.

 Advertising 

It was reported in an article in The Daily Mail'' on 2 November 2014 that claims that the charity "was spending 90 per cent of its income on conservation" by the UK Advertising Standards Authority were incorrect. The article claimed that the true figure was closer to 26%. The Charity Commission investigated the claims, and contacted the RSPB to get it to clarify its web statement. The RSPB complied, with the clarification that 90% of its net income (after expenses, not gross income as received) was spent on conservation, and that conservation activities were diverse, not limited to spending on its own nature reserves. This was accepted by the Charity Commission.

Presidents

Winifred Cavendish-Bentinck, Duchess of Portland 1891–1954
Cyril Hurcomb
Colonel Sir Tufton Beamish
Derek Barber, Baron Barber of Tewkesbury
Robert Dougall 
Max Nicholson 1980–1985
Magnus Magnusson 1985–1990
Sir Derek Barber 1990–1991 
Ian Prestt 1991–1994
Julian Pettifer 1994–?
Jonathan Dimbleby 2001–?
Julian Pettifer 2004–2009
Kate Humble 2009–2013
 Miranda Krestovnikoff 2013–2022 
 Dr Amir Khan GP 2022-(incumbent)

Chief officers
Over time, the organisation's chief officers have been given different titles.

 William Henry Hudson – Chairman of Committee 1894
 Sir Montagu Sharpe, KBE DL – Chairman of Committee 1895–1942
 Phillip Brown
 Peter Conder OBE – Secretary 1963. Director 1964–1975
 Ian Prestt CBE – Director General 1975–1991
 Barbara Young – CEO 1991–1998
 Sir Graham Wynne – CEO 1998–2010
 Mike Clarke – Chief Executive 2010–2019
 Beccy Speight - Chief Executive 2019-

Associate organisations
The RSPB is a member of Wildlife and Countryside Link. The RSPB is the UK Partner of BirdLife International and manages the South Atlantic Invasive Species Project on behalf of the partner governments.

See also
List of Birdlife International national partner organisations
Royal Society for the Prevention of Cruelty to Animals
National Trust for Places of Historic Interest or Natural Beauty
Wildlife law in England and Wales 
:Category:Royal Society for the Protection of Birds reserves

Notes

Bibliography

External links
RSPB.org.uk — official website
RSPB images

 
Organizations established in 1889
Environmental organisations based in England
Ornithological organisations in the United Kingdom
Animal charities based in the United Kingdom
1889 establishments in the United Kingdom
1889 establishments in England
Charities based in Bedfordshire
Bird conservation organizations
British landowners